Scm-like with four mbt domains 1 is a protein that in humans is encoded by the SFMBT1 gene.

Function
This gene shares high similarity with the Drosophila Scm (sex comb on midleg) gene. It encodes a protein which contains four malignant brain tumor repeat (mbt) domains and may be involved in antigen recognition. [provided by RefSeq, Jun 2012].

References

Further reading 

Genes on human chromosome 3